, also archaically romanized as Hongwanji, is the collective name of the largest school of Jōdo Shinshū Buddhism (which further sub-divides into the Nishi and Higashi branches). 'Hongan-ji' may also refer to any one of several actual temple buildings associated with the sect. Nishi Honganji (西本願寺) and Higashi Honganji (東本願寺) are two major temples in Kyoto.

Early history
The Hongan-ji was established as a temple in 1321, on the site of the Ōtani Mausoleum, where Shinran, the founder of the Jōdo Shinshū ("True Pure Land") was buried.  The mausoleum was attended by Shinran's grandson (through daughter Kakushinni), Kakue.  Kakue's own son, Kakunyo, became the first chief priest of the Hongan-ji and third monshu (spiritual leader), and dedicated it to the worship of Amitābha (Amida). The Hongan-ji first gained power and importance in the 15th century, when Rennyo became its eighth monshu. However, the Tendai sect based on Mount Hiei saw this expansion as a threat and attacked the Hongan-ji three times with its army of sōhei. Rennyo fled to Yoshizaki-gobō, where he established a new temple compound.

During the Sengoku period, fearing the power of the monks of the Hongan-ji, Oda Nobunaga tried to destroy it. For ten years, he laid siege to the Ishiyama Hongan-ji in Osaka, one of the two primary temple fortresses of the sect. In 1580, the abbot of the Ishiyama Hongan-ji, Kennyo, surrendered, while his son Kyōnyo refused to surrender, for which he was publicly disowned.

After the death of Nobunaga in 1582 and the ascent of Toyotomi Hideyoshi, Kennyo was rewarded for his opposition to Nobunaga by being granted land in Kyoto, at the site of modern-day Nishi Hongan-ji (西本願寺, "Western Hongan-ji"; sometimes called the Honpa Hongan-ji 本派本願寺). He was succeeded by his legitimate son, Junnyo, as abbot in 1592. While his brother Kyōnyo re-established the Osaka Hongan-ji in 1596 with local support, owing to his refusal to surrender to Nobunaga earlier. After the death of Hideyoshi in 1598, Kyōnyo openly supported Tokugawa Ieyasu, who became shōgun in 1602. In reward for his loyalty, Kyōnyo was rewarded with land for a temple in Kyoto to the east of Nishi Honganji, which then became known in 1603 as Higashi Honganji (東本願寺 "Eastern Hongan-ji"). In 1619 the government recognized the two entities as separate congregations. It is popularly believed, however mistakenly, that the institution was split in two in order to maintain control of the order.

Modern divisions of the Hongan-ji

Nishi Hongan-ji

Formally known as the Jodo-Shinshu Honganji-ha, it is the largest of all the Jodo Shinshu branches.  Compared with the Higashi Hongan-ji, it has a history of institutional stability that accounts for high membership figures, and a larger geographical reach, but fewer well-known modern thinkers.  The Nishi Hongan-ji has a sizable number of overseas temples in the United States, South America, Hawai'i, Canada, and Europe which are organized into several kyodan ("districts").   The largest of these is the Buddhist Churches of America.

The Hongwanji International Center, to the east of Nishi Hongan-ji, coordinates dialogue with Jōdo Shinshū organizations around the world and produces translation work.

The Nishi Hongan-ji operates the Hongwanji Publishing Company which produces books, music, films, and anime about Jōdo Shinshū Buddhism. They also publish a bimonthly newspaper, the Hongwanji Journal and their website includes, among other things, a TV channel devoted to explaining Buddhism and Hongan-ji's everyday operations.

Higashi Hongan-ji

Higashi Hongan-ji is one of the two dominant subsects of Jōdo Shinshū, the other being the Nishi Honganji.

During the Meiji Restoration in the 1860s, the government set down new guidelines for the management of religious organizations. An organization called Ōtani-ha was put in control of Higashi Hongan-ji. In 1987, this temple was renamed Shinshū Honbyō "Shinshū Mausoleum", although the earlier name is still used. The buildings have not been changed or moved, and of course the historical cultural and religious significance of the place has not changed.

Due to opposition to the creation of the Ōtani-ha, and a number of other controversies and disputes such as the Ohigashi schism, several new Higashi Hongan-ji branches came into existence such as the Higashiyama Hongan-ji, founded in Kyoto in 1996 by Otani Korin, and the Tokyo Higashi Hongan-ji, whose current leader is Otani Koken. Despite, or perhaps even because of, this climate of instability, the Higashi Hongan-ji movement has also produced a significant number of controversial but influential thinkers, such as Soga Ryōjin, Kiyozawa Manshi, Kaneko Daiei and Akegarasu Haya, amongst others.

The largest Higashi Hongan-ji grouping, the Ōtani-ha has approximately 5.5 million members, according to statistics.

Joint activities

In recent years some members of the Honganji sects have been involved in high-profile protests against the visits of Japanese politicians to the controversial Yasukuni Shrine.

Along with the other non-Honganji Jōdo Shinshū subsects, the Honganji issued a statement opposing the 2003 invasion of Iraq.

Important Hongan-ji buildings

Higashi Hongan-ji

The Shinshū Honbyō, the mausoleum of Shinran, is now owned by the Ōtani-ha but is still commonly called Higashi Hongan-ji (東本願寺) by Kyoto visitors and locals. The massive Goei-dō (also known as Mie-dō), or Founder's Hall Gate, is often one of the first things one sees walking north from JR Kyōto Station. Nearly identical to the Nishi Hongan-ji head temple in layout, it too features an Amida-dō, and a larger Mie-dō. The Mie-dō at Higashi Hongan-ji dates from 1895 and vies with a number of other structures for the claim of largest wooden building in the world.

A few blocks from the main grounds of the Higashi Hongan-ji is the Shosei-en garden, owned by the temple. Poet-scholar Ishikawa Jozan and landscape architect Kobori Masakazu are said to have contributed to its design in the 17th century.

Nishi Hongan-ji

The Nishi Honganji, like the Higashi Honganji, features a huge Goeidō (御影堂), Kaisando and a smaller Amida-dō (阿弥陀堂) or Amitābha hall housing an image of Amitābha. Nishi Hongan-ji's Kura (倉), or storehouse, houses many National Treasures, most of which are not on view for the public. The shoin (書院), or study hall, is also quite famous; it is split into two sections, the shiro-shoin(白書院), or white study hall, and the kuro-shoin(黒書院), or black study hall.

Nishi Hongan-ji also contains a large shōgun complex from the medieval period, which was largely moved into the temple from elsewhere in Kyoto in the 16th century. This includes Hiunkaku (飛雲閣), a large tea pavilion, four Noh stages, one of which is thought to be the oldest in existence and the other being the largest outdoor Noh stage, and the Kokei no Niwa (虎渓の庭) garden.

Some medieval parts of Nishi Hongan-ji are now independent organizations: Ryukoku University and Kōshō-ji.

See also
List of Special Places of Scenic Beauty, Special Historic Sites and Special Natural Monuments
Ikkō-shū
Historic Monuments of Ancient Kyoto (Kyoto, Uji and Otsu Cities)
Tsukiji Hongan-ji, Tokyo
Ishiyama Hongan-ji, destroyed 1580, now the site of Osaka Castle
Yamashina Hongan-ji
 For an explanation of terms concerning Japanese Buddhism, Japanese Buddhist art, and Japanese Buddhist temple architecture, see the Glossary of Japanese Buddhism.
 Hongwanji Mission School

References

Bibliography
 Ducor, Jérôme : Terre Pure, Zen et autorité : La Dispute de l'ère Jôô et la Réfutation du Mémorandum sur des contradictions de la foi par Ryônyo du Honganji, avec une traduction annotée du Ha Anjin-sôi-no-oboegaki (Collège de France, Bibliothèque de l'Institut des Hautes Etudes Japonaises); Paris, De Boccard, 2007.
 Popular Buddhism In Japan: Shin Buddhist Religion & Culture by Esben Andreasen, p. 11 University of Hawaii Press 1998, 
 Rogers, Minor L and Ann T. (1990). The Honganji: Guardian of the state (1868–1945), Japanese Journal of Religious Studies 17 (1), 3-28

External links
 Homepage for Nishi Hongwanji - English
 Homepage for Shinshu Otani-ha Higashi Honganji Denomination - English
 Homepage for Jodo Shinshu Hongwanji-ha Hongwanji International Center - English
 Homepage for Higashi Honganji-ha (Tokyo Honganji) - Japanese

1321 establishments in Asia
Religious organizations established in the 1320s
World Heritage Sites in Japan
Buddhist temples in Kyoto
1320s establishments in Japan